Kyle Nelson (born April 20, 1991) is a Canadian mixed martial artist who competes in the UFC Featherweight division. He previously competed for the RXF promotion, as well as Elite 1 MMA. Nelson is a former featherweight champion in Elite 1 MMA.

Mixed martial arts career

Early career
Born and raised in Huntsville, Ontario Canada, Nelson began competing in mixed martial arts in 2011. He held a 2–1 amateur record and then competed in local North American professional promotions. During this time he won the Elite 1 MMA Featherweight Championship, and also fought for the Lightweight Championship in TXC MMA. He then signed with the RXF in Romania, Europe, and after with the UFC in 2018.

Ultimate Fighting Championship
Nelson made his promotional debut on December 8, 2018, on short notice against Carlos Diego Ferreira, replacing Jesse Ronson at UFC 231. He lost the fight via TKO in the second round.

Returning to Featherweight Nelson next faced Matt Sayles on May 4, 2019, at UFC on ESPN+ 9.  He lost the fight via submission via arm-triangle choke 3:16 into round 3.

Nelson fought next at UFC on ESPN+ 17 on September 21, 2019 against Marco Polo Reyes. He won the fight via TKO at 1:36 of round 1, earning him his first UFC victory.

Nelson was scheduled to face Sean Woodson in a catchweight bout of 150 pounds on June 27, 2020 at UFC on ESPN: Poirier vs. Hooker.  However, Nelson was pulled form the event due to visa issue and he was replaced by Julian Erosa.

Nelson faced Billy Quarantillo on September 12, 2020 at UFC Fight Night: Santos vs. Teixeira. He lost the fight via knockout in the third round.

Nelson faced Jai Herbert on July 23, 2022 at UFC Fight Night: Blaydes vs. Aspinall. He lost the fight by unanimous decision.

Nelson faced Choi Doo-ho on February 4, 2023, at UFC Fight Night 218. The fight ended via majority draw.

Championships and accomplishments
Elite1 Mixed Martial Arts
Featherweight Championship

Mixed martial arts record

|-
|Draw
|align=center|
|Choi Doo-ho
|Draw (majority)
|UFC Fight Night: Lewis vs. Spivak
|
|align=center|3
|align=center|5:00
|Las Vegas, Nevada, United States
|
|-
|Loss
|align=center|13–5
|Jai Herbert
|Decision (unanimous)
|UFC Fight Night: Blaydes vs. Aspinall 
|
|align=center|3
|align=center|5:00
|London, England
|
|-
|Loss
|align=center|13–4
|Billy Quarantillo
|KO (punch)
|UFC Fight Night: Waterson vs. Hill
|
|align=center|3
|align=center|0:07
|Las Vegas, Nevada, United States
|
|-
| Win
| align=center|13–3
| Polo Reyes
| TKO (punches)
| UFC Fight Night: Rodríguez vs. Stephens 
| 
|align=center|1
|align=center|1:36
| Mexico City, Mexico
|
|-
|Loss
| align=center|12–3
| Matt Sayles
| Submission (arm-triangle choke)
| UFC Fight Night: Iaquinta vs. Cowboy 
| 
|align=center|3
|align=center|3:16
| Ottawa, Ontario, Canada
| 
|-
| Loss
| align=center|12–2
| Carlos Diego Ferreira
| TKO (punches)
| UFC 231
| 
| align=center|2
| align=center|1:23
| Toronto, Ontario, Canada
|
|-
| Win
| align=center|12–1
| Morteza Rezaei
| TKO (punches)
| RXF 32
| 
| align=center|1
| align=center|4:57
| Brașov, Romania
|
|-
| Win
| align=center| 11–1
| Khama Worthy
| KO (punches)
| BTC 1: Genesis
| 
| align=center| 1
| align=center| 1:03
| Toronto, Ontario, Canada
| 
|-
| Win
| align=center| 10–1
| Gabriel Mănucă 
| Submission (rear naked choke)
| RXF 26
| 
| align=center| 1
| align=center| 3:50
| Brașov, Romania
|
|-
| Win
| align=center| 9–1
| Jonathan Brookins
| Decision (split)
| Fight Night 2
| 
| align=center| 3
| align=center| 5:00
| Medicine Hat, Alberta, Canada
|
|-
| Win
| align=center| 8–1
| Zoltán Turi
| Submission (rear naked choke)
| RXF 23: Romania vs. United Kingdom
| 
| align=center| 1
| align=center| 1:23
| Bucharest, Romania
| 
|-
| Win
| align=center| 7–1
| Justin Bourgeois
| TKO (Punches)
| Elite 1 MMA
| 
| align=center| 1
| align=center| 2:01
| Moncton, New Brunswick, Canada
| 
|-
| Loss
| align=center| 6–1
| Adrian Hadribeaj 
| Decision (unanimous)
| TXC Legends 6
| 
| align=center| 5
| align=center| 5:00
| Novi, Michigan, United States
|
|-
| Win
| align=center| 6–0
| Ainsley Robinson
| Submission (guillotine choke)
| SCC 2
| 
| align=center| 1
| align=center| 0:42
| Toronto, Ontario, Canada
| 
|-
| Win
| align=center| 5–0
| Alex Halkias
| Decision (unanimous)
| Provincial FC 2
| 
| align=center| 3
| align=center| 5:00
| London, Ontario, Canada
| 
|-
| Win
| align=center| 4–0
| Neelan Hordatt
| Decision (split)
| ECC 11: Redemption
| 
| align=center| 3
| align=center| 5:00
| Toronto, Ontario, Canada
| 
|-
| Win
| align=center| 3–0
| Maxime Dubois
| TKO (punches)
| UGC 32: Moment de Vérité
| 
| align=center| 2
| align=center| 1:36
| Montreal, Quebec, Canada
| 
|-
| Win
| align=center| 2–0
| Jo Petahtegoose
| Submission (armbar)
| Score Fighting Series 6
| 
| align=center| 1
| align=center| 2:54
| Sarnia, Ontario, Canada
|
|-
| Win
| align=center| 1–0
| Michael Dufort
| Decision (unanimous)
| Ringside MMA 13
| 
| align=center| 3
| align=center| 5:00
| Montreal, Quebec, Canada
|
|-

See also
 List of current UFC fighters
 List of Canadian UFC fighters
 List of male mixed martial artists

References

External links
 
 

Canadian male mixed martial artists
Living people
1991 births
People from Huntsville, Ontario
Sportspeople from Ontario
Ultimate Fighting Championship male fighters
Featherweight mixed martial artists
Mixed martial artists utilizing Brazilian jiu-jitsu
Canadian practitioners of Brazilian jiu-jitsu